This page shows the results of the Men's Central American and Caribbean Basketball Championship, also known as the 2003 Centrobasket, which was held in the city of Culiacán, Mexico from June 17 to June 22, 2003.

Competing nations

Preliminary round

2003-06-17

2003-06-18

2003-06-19

 

2003-06-17

2003-06-18

2003-06-19

Second round
2003-06-20 — 5th/8th place

2003-06-20 — 1st/4th place

Final round
2003-06-21 — 7th/8th place

2003-06-21 — 5th/6th place

2003-06-21 — 3rd/4th place

2003-06-21 — 1st/2nd place

Final ranking

1. 

2. 

3. 

4. 

5. 

6. 

7. 

8.

References
FIBA
LatinBasket

Centrobasket
2002–03 in North American basketball
2003 in Central American sport
2003 in Caribbean sport
2003 in Mexican sports
International basketball competitions hosted by Mexico